The commune of Bururi is a commune of Bururi Province in south-western Burundi. The capital lies at Bururi.
In 2007, DGHER electrified one rural village in the commune.

Geography

Settlements

Bururi
Buta
Gahama
Gasanda
Gatanga
Gikokoma
Gisarenda
Kabogora
Kagomogomo
Kajabure
Kamvumvu
Karimbi
Kibango
Kiganda
Kimongozi
Kinama
Kirabuke
Kiremba
Kivuruga
Mahando
Miremera
Mpinga
Mudaraza
Munini
Munyegeri
Murehe
Murinda
Musagara
Musorora
Muyuga
Muzura
Nanira
Ndagano
Ndava
Nyakarambo
Nyange
Rudegwe
Rurembera
Rushiha
Rwankona
Shembe
Showe
Taba
Tarire

References

Communes of Burundi
Bururi Province